In 1994 and early 1995, seven demonstration races for the newly-born NASCAR SuperTruck Series were held. The races were broadcast during coverage of the Winter Heat Series and were held on tracks primarily based on the West Coast of the United States, featuring four to five trucks each. The series helped begin the careers of future NASCAR drivers like Greg Biffle, Kurt Busch, Matt Crafton, and Ron Hornaday Jr.

Another exhibition race was held at the Homestead Motorsports Complex at the end of the 1995 season called the NASCAR Supertruck 25, though not as a Winter Heat race.

Supertruck Mesa Marin 20

The race was run as a support event to the NASCAR Featherlite Southwest Tour.

After leading the first lap, he lost the lead to offroad racer Dave Ashley, who led for seven laps before relinquishing it to Rob MacCachren. MacCachren would lead until lap 13, when P. J. Jones claimed first, and led for the remainder of the race, beating Gary Collins by 15 seconds. Jones won the race in a Ford, though the team switched to Chevrolet for the next race after General Motors offered the team a technical package.

Race results

Supertruck Portland 20

The race, run as an undercard to the NASCAR AutoZone Elite Division, Northwest Series, was sold out.

After starting second, Rob MacCachren led all 20 laps of the race.

Race results

Supertruck Saugus 20

The race, held as part of a Featherlite Southwest Tour race weekend, featured a sellout crowd of 6,308.

Gary Collins led the entire race. Originally scheduled for 20 laps, the race was cut by five laps after an incident on lap 14 and after the caution started to rain; P. J. Jones, who was in second, backed his Ford into the wall between turns 3 and 4. At the same time, it began raining at the track which led the race to be the first ever Truck series event shortened due to rain. As a result, the race ended under caution. Craig Huartson did not finish the race when his engine failed after completing four laps.

Race results

Supertruck Tucson 20

Mike Hurlbert failed to start the race. After Gary Collins led the first lap, P. J. Jones, Ron Hornaday Jr. and Rick Carelli each led for one lap until Jones inherited the lead on lap 5. Craig Huartson led lap 6 before Jones reclaimed first, leading for three laps. Huartson retook the lead on lap 10, but relinquished it to Rob MacCachren on lap 11, who led two laps before Hornaday passed him for first. Hornaday led the final 13 laps to win the race.

Race results

Supertruck Winter Heat 200 No. 1

The race, along with the next two, were broadcast nationally by The Nashville Network as part of the Winter Heat program, an eight-week series featuring both the SuperTrucks and the Winston West Series. Former San Francisco 49ers kicker Mike Cofer, who had won on the regional Southwest Tour, was initially scheduled to run the race but did not.

Mike Skinner led the first 62 laps of the race; halfway through his run, a caution for debris was called on lap 32. Rick Carelli and Skinner traded the lead on laps 64 and 65 before the former led 79 straight laps. The No. 54 of Steve McEachern spun on the frontstretch on lap 86, bringing out the second caution of the day. On lap 137, T. J. Clark crashed in turn two to force a third caution. Shortly after the green flag wove on lap 143, Ron Hornaday Jr. took the lead, leading for 24 laps before relinquishing it to Carelli. The two battled for first until lap 176, when Carelli held on to the position for the final 25 laps to win.

Dave Ashley failed to start the race. Off-road racer Robby Gordon suffered an engine failure on lap 53, while Mike Hurlbert and T. J. Clark had rear end and suspension problems on laps 86 and 127, respectively.

Race results

Supertruck Winter Heat 200 No. 2

The second of the Winter Heat races, a competition caution was implemented to be flown at the race's halfway point on lap 100. Pole-sitter Ron Hornaday Jr. led the first 71 laps of the event. During his run, a caution was flown on lap 38 for Ken Schrader's slow truck. Hornaday gave up the lead to Mike Skinner on lap 72. Steve McEachern spun in turn 4 on lap 131 to force another caution, while the third and final yellow flag of the day occurred on lap 141 for debris. Skinner continued to lead until lap 177 when P. J. Jones passed him. Jones led the final 23 laps to win.

Two drivers failed to finish the race: Kerry Teague's engine failed on lap 38, while Johnny Benson failed to start.

Race results

Supertruck Winter Heat No. 3 (1995)

In comparison to the first two Winter Heat races, the third was marred by cautions; six accidents occurred during the race. Butch Gilliland led the first ten laps of the race before Ron Hornaday Jr. took the lead, holding on for 91 laps. During Hornaday's run from laps 11–101, two cautions were flown: Bob Strait and Steve McEachern crashed in turn three on lap 39, while Craig Huartson spun in turn one on lap 59. The third caution, a result of Kerry Teague's truck spilling oil on the track, resulted in Hornaday losing the lead to Rick Carelli. He led until lap 149, when Mike Skinner took first. Two laps later, the Nos. 2 and 23 trucks of Dave Ashley and T. J. Clark were involved in a crash in turn one. The final caution period of the day came on lap 197 when Gilliland spun in turn four, forcing a green–white–checker finish and extending the race by four laps. Skinner led those laps to win the race.

Of the 18 drivers competing, seven did not finish the race: T. J. Clark retired on lap 187 for overheating issues, P. J. Jones' brakes failed on lap 165, Tobey Butler and Teague both suffered engine problems on laps 100 and 99, respectively, Walker Evans' truck overheated on lap 73 and Strait and McEachern's crash forced both of them out of the race.

Race results

NASCAR Supertruck 25 (1995)

Following the end of the 1995 NASCAR SuperTruck Series season, the series held a 25-lap exhibition race at the newly-opened Homestead Motorsports Complex. At the time, the track resembled a smaller Indianapolis Motor Speedway and was praised by series champion Mike Skinner. As trucks weren't as aerodynamic as regular stock cars, he commented, drivers had to be more cautious entering the turns.

Pole-sitter Jimmy Hensley led the first two laps before Skinner took the lead. Skinner led until lap 12, when the competition caution was waved, and Geoff Bodine claimed first. Bodine led for three laps, followed by Skinner leading for a lap, then Butch Miller for two laps. Bodine took the lead from Miller on lap 19, and led all but one of the final seven laps (Skinner led lap 22) to beat Skinner by 0.1 seconds. Ernie Irvan, who had failed to qualify for the Busch Series race, finished third.

The track was added to the 1996 NASCAR Craftsman Truck Series schedule as the opening race.

Race results

See also
1994 NASCAR Winston Cup Series
1994 NASCAR Busch Series
1995 NASCAR SuperTruck Series
1995 NASCAR Winston Cup Series
1995 NASCAR Busch Series

References

NASCAR Truck Series
1994 in NASCAR
1995 in NASCAR